The Palm Harbor Museum (formerly called North Pinellas Historical Museum) is located in the historic Hartley House in Palm Harbor, Florida. The house was built by Thomas W. Hartley, with help from his brother William, between 1914 and 1919, on property bought by his father, James Hartley, about 1880.  The house was designed to accommodate the Hartley Family (Thomas, his wife Ida Stanton Hartley and their children Lucy, Clarine, Leonard and Orion).  The house was built on a reinforced concrete foundation with concrete block construction.  The blocks were poured on-site, made with sand from a nearby scrub.  The outside surfaces of the blocks were cast to simulate a stone finish.  Each block weighed 84 pounds and the blocks were joined with pink mortar, which is said to have gotten its unusual color from crushed berries.  A hall ran the length of the downstairs; walls were reinforced concrete to provide bearing support for the second floor.  Downstairs rooms have 10 foot high ceilings and upstairs are 8 feet high.  The upstairs rooms were never completed by the family due to shortage of funds. The house was not wired for electricity until the 1940s. Two wooden porches that existed when the house was first built wore out and were removed by the 1950s. 

The house was acquired in 1996 by Pinellas County as part of the extension of Belcher Rd; as a "satellite campus" to Heritage Village. It serves now as the Palm Harbor Museum which is dedicated to preserving the history of Palm Harbor, Crystal Beach, Florida, Ozona, East Lake, Wall Springs and Curlew. Emphasis is on Florida pioneer history from 1800s to the present, although aspects of Native American history are included.

The Palm Harbor Museum opened in 1998. It is operated and maintained by the Palm Harbor Historical Society. It is located at 2043 Curlew Road. Current exhibitions include the history of the Citrus Industry (exhibits within an authentic renovated Grove House), "The Hartley Family", "Lois Oxnam, Ranch Manager of Boot Ranch", "Faith Mission Children's Home", "Where is Palm Harbor", "Ozona, Overfished". The house also highlights the lives of the Hartley Family and how they lived. Many of the downstairs rooms were preserved and along with some original furniture you can see how this family lived during this period.

Admission is free. Interactive activities are available to visitors of all ages. Picnic Tables on the grounds can be used by the public. The property belongs to Pinellas County and can be considered as a "pocket park" for public visitation. Native Plants will soon be installed along with outside interpretive signage to augment the historical and environmental usefulness of this landmark site.

References

External links
Palm Harbor Museum - official website

Museums in Pinellas County, Florida
Historical society museums in Florida
1998 establishments in Florida